Ivy Austin (born Ivy Lynn Epstein; January 19, 1958 in Brooklyn, New York) is an American actress, singer, and voice-over artist, known for her performances on Garrison Keillor's A Prairie Home Companion and her Sesame Street voices. She also starred on Broadway as Raggedy Ann.

Biography

Early life and education
Ivy Austin is an alumna of NYC’s High School of Performing Arts, has a Bachelor of Arts degree in Biology from Colgate University, and a Master of Science degree in Marriage and Family Therapy from Manhattan College.

Career
Austin's stage career began with national tours of Hair (as Crissy) in 1976 and They're Playing Our Song (Alter Ego) in 1979. She made her New York City Opera debut in 1982's Candide (Pink Sheep) and remained on the guest artist roster through 1989. Other NYCO credits include Naughty Marietta (Lisette), The Merry Widow (Zozo), The Music Man (Ethel Toffelmier), The New Moon, The Desert Song, South Pacific, and Sweeney Todd (Beggar Woman). Austin's Broadway debut in 1986 was as the starring role in the Joe Raposo/William Gibson musical Raggedy Ann: The Musical Adventure, directed by Patricia Birch.

In 1989, Austin performed "The Story of Gloria" on American Radio Company (now known as A Prairie Home Companion). According to Time Magazine, "The show's funniest sketch, a serial, produced a new star, actress Ivy Austin." She also played the crusty-voiced French lady Babette, and sang with Rob Fisher and The Coffee Club Orchestra.

Austin has recorded countless songs for Sesame Street, and is the voice of Sesame Street characters Cereal Girl, Hammy Swinette, Sublime Miss M, Soo-ey Oinker of The Oinker Sisters, and Gloria Esta-worm.  As writer/producer, Ivy Austin created holiday programs for National Public Radio and a long-running concert series at The World Financial Center. Ivy Austin appeared in numerous television commercials and has an impressive list of theatrical and concert credits.

Austin is in her sixth year as a contributing lyricist and performer in The Thalia Follies, a political satire in on New York's Upper West Side.

Austin performs regularly at Symphony Space on WNYC radio broadcasts of Selected Shorts and Bloomsday, and has participated in years of "Wall-to-Wall" music marathons. She appeared in Wall-to-Wall Broadway singing "Adelaide's Lament". She has performed several plays with the Night Kitchen Radio Theater for XM Satellite Radio.

Selected credits

Discography
Sing! Songs of Joe Raposo
Big Bird Discovers the Orchestra
Sesame Road
Born to Add
Splish Splash: Bathtime Fun
Sing-Along Travel Songs
Silly Songs
Hot!/Heat! Hot!/Heat! Hot!/Heat! Dance Songs
Sesame Street Platinum-All Time Favorites
Elmopalooza!
We Are All Earthlings
I’m Green and I’m Proud
Signs of the Times from Moo-town Records
Sesame Street Kids/Kid Favorite Songs
Sesame Street Best
Cheap Thrills
New York City Opera Candide
Lady Be Good!
Wall to Wall Richard Rodgers
A Prairie Home Christmas
A Prairie Home Companion 25th Anniversary Collection
Selected Shorts: A Night at the Office

Filmography
Grease 2 (1982) – Girl Greaser (Francine)
"The Charmkins" (1983) – Skunkweed (voice)
My Little Pony: Escape from Catrina (1985) – (voice)
Snoopy!!! The Musical (1988) – (voice)
Sesame Street – Cereal Girl, Hammy Swinette, Sublime Miss M, Soo-ey Oinker of The Oinker Sisters, Gloria Esta-worm, Additional Voices
High Strung (1991) – Contestant
Big Bird's Birthday Celebration (1991) – (voice) Oinker Sister
The Tale of Peter Rabbit (1991) – (voice) Flopsy/Bluejay
Animaniacs – Carloota, "Garage Sale of the Century/West Side Pigeons" (1993)
Sesame Street Stays Up Late! (1993) – (voice) Tita
The Real Shlemiel (1995) – (voice) The Lantuch
Elmopalooza! (1998) – (voice) Oinker Sister
Kids Favorite Songs (1999) - (voice) Oinker Sister

Theatre credits

Artistic direction and producing
Christmas at Rainbow Corner (co-producer Denise Lanctot) 1993, National Public Radio
Her Funny Valentine, 1994, National Public Radio
Women in Cabaret, 1994, World Financial Center
Women on Broadway, 1995, World Financial Center
The Tony Awards, 50 Years of Broadway's Best Musicals, 1996, World Financial Center
The Men I Love, A Centennial Salute to Ira Gershwin & George Gershwin, 1997, World Financial Center
Happy Birthday New York, A Musical Tribute to the City's Centennial, 1998, World Financial Center
The Great Songwriters of Hollywood, 1999, World Financial Center
Spring Fling, 2000, World Financial Center

References

External links

1958 births
Living people
American voice actresses
Colgate University alumni
People from Brooklyn
Actresses from New York City
Jewish American actresses
Jewish singers
American women singers
21st-century American Jews
21st-century American women